is a Japanese sprinter who specialises in the 100 and 200 metres.

Takahira competed in the 200 m at the 2004 Athens Olympics and the 2005 World Championships but failed to progress beyond the heats. He took the silver medal at the 2005 Summer Universiade. He represented Japan in his home country at the 2007 Osaka World Championships and reached the quarter-finals of the 200 m event.

Takahira represented Japan at the 2008 Summer Olympics in Beijing. He competed at the 4x100 metres relay together with Naoki Tsukahara, Shingo Suetsugu and Nobuharu Asahara. In their qualification heat they placed second in behind Trinidad and Tobago, but in front of the Netherlands and Brazil. Their time of 38.52 was the third fastest out of sixteen participating nations in the first round and they qualified for the final. There they sprinted to a time of 38.15 seconds, the third time after the Jamaican and Trinidad teams, winning the bronze medal. However, in January 2017, Jamaica's medal was revoked due to one of their athletes proven to have been doping; this meant that Japan now moved up to a silver medal. He also took part in the 200 metres individual. In his first round heat he placed fourth in a time of 20.58 seconds, outside of the direct qualifiers. His time was however among the best losing times, securing his second round spot. In the second round he came to a time of 20.63 seconds and was eliminated as he only placed seventh in the heat.

Takahira made a good start to the 2009 season, finishing second and recording a new 200 m best of 20.31 s at the 2009 Osaka Grand Prix. He felt spurred on by running against American athlete Rodney Martin and stated that he hoped to make the semis or final of the forthcoming Berlin World Championships. He won the 200 m at the Japanese Championships, breaking his personal best with a run of 20.22 seconds. This was the third-fastest time ever run in Japan, and Takahira said "I was secretly hoping for Suetsugu’s (national) record".

Achievements

Competition record

Personal bests

References

1984 births
Living people
People from Asahikawa
Sportspeople from Hokkaido
Japanese male sprinters
Olympic athletes of Japan
Olympic silver medalists for Japan
Olympic silver medalists in athletics (track and field)
Athletes (track and field) at the 2004 Summer Olympics
Athletes (track and field) at the 2008 Summer Olympics
Athletes (track and field) at the 2012 Summer Olympics
Medalists at the 2008 Summer Olympics
Asian Games gold medalists for Japan
Asian Games silver medalists for Japan
Asian Games bronze medalists for Japan
Asian Games medalists in athletics (track and field)
Athletes (track and field) at the 2006 Asian Games
Athletes (track and field) at the 2010 Asian Games
Athletes (track and field) at the 2014 Asian Games
Medalists at the 2006 Asian Games
Medalists at the 2014 Asian Games
Universiade gold medalists for Japan
Universiade silver medalists for Japan
Universiade medalists in athletics (track and field)
Medalists at the 2005 Summer Universiade
Medalists at the 2003 Summer Universiade
World Athletics Championships athletes for Japan
Japan Championships in Athletics winners
Fujitsu people